"Strongest" is a song recorded by Norwegian singer and songwriter Ina Wroldsen. The song was released on 27 October 2017 and has peaked at number 2 in Norway.

"Strongest" is Wroldsen's first solo release on Syco Music after signing to the label in June 2017. The track centers its message on the heartbreak of a lost love and moving forward with her son.

In an interview with Charlotte Sissener of Musikknyheter, Wroldsen said the song is about a good friend of hers, saying the situation is "hard and bitter, but also genuine and triumphant."

Track listing

Charts

Weekly charts

Year-end charts

Release history

References

2017 songs
2017 singles
Ina Wroldsen songs
Songs written by Arnthor Birgisson
Songs written by Ina Wroldsen
Syco Music singles